The men's snowboard cross competition of the 2014 Winter Paralympics will be held at Rosa Khutor Extreme Park near Krasnaya Polyana, Russia. The competition is scheduled for 14 March 2014. It will be making its Winter Paralympics debut. The only classification taking part in this event are the standing athletes.

Results
Each athlete will race the course 3 times and their top 2 times will be added together to get the total time.

See also
Alpine skiing at the 2014 Winter Olympics

References

Men's snowboard cross